State Road 20 (SR 20) is a  east-to-west route across northern Florida and the Florida Panhandle in the United States.

Route description

Okaloosa County (Niceville and Bluewater Bay) 
SR 20 starts at SR 85 in Niceville as John Sims Parkway, which travels to Eglin AFB East Gate through Valparaiso as westbound SR 85 and southbound SR 397. SR 20 heads slightly southeast while SR 85 goes north towards Crestview. The road shortly after intersects the southern terminus of SR 285 as it passes by Niceville High School, reducing to four lanes from six lanes. SR 20 continues straight through Niceville before turning more southeast, crossing the C.G. Meigs Bridge over Rocky Bayou, exiting the Niceville city limits and entering Bluewater Bay. 3 miles later, the road intersects SR 293, providing access to Destin via the Mid-Bay Bridge before reducing to two lanes and entering Walton County.

Walton County 
Briefly after crossing the county line, SR 20 continues southeast before turning east into Choctaw Beach, skirting along the Choctawhatchee Bay, as a two lane road. Shortly after the second intersection with CR 83A, the road intersects US 331 Business, which happens to be US 331's old alignment through Freeport. SR 20 shortly after intersects US 331, exiting the town shortly after. Throughout the rest of Walton County, SR 20 does not intersect many roads other than SR 81 in Bruce, continuing eastbound.

Washington County 
SR 20 is very short through Washington County, only intersecting SR 79 in Ebro leading to Panama City Beach/Bonifay. The road runs for 5 miles before straddling the Washington/Bay county line for another 6 miles before veering southeast into Bay County.

Bay County 
Only about a mile after completely going into Bay County, SR 20 intersects SR 77, passing by several lakes for a few miles before turning northeast. The road intersects Blue Springs Road, then turning directly east and running close to the Washington County line, but still entirely in Bay County. After the county line ends, the road heads straight east, intersecting US 231 between Fountain and Youngstown, and then enters Calhoun County.

Calhoun County 
State Road 20 continues heading straight east before veering southeast, then curving northeast, to finally resume the straight eastward pattern. The road becomes the southern terminus of SR 287 before entering a very short concurrency with SR 73 in Clarksville. Outside of it, the route intersects CR 275 between Clarksville and Blountstown. Through Blountstown, SR 20 is known as Central Avenue, still being a two lane road. The road slightly expands to include turn medians, intersecting SR 71, which allows access to SR 69. Shortly after, the road passes by the county sheriff's office and the courthouse. After Blountstown, the road becomes four lane, crossing the Apalachicola River on the Trammell Bridge into Liberty County.

Liberty County 
After crossing the Apalachicola River, the road immediately heads into Bristol, remaining a four lane road through the town, intersecting SR 12 in the process. SR 20 then goes slightly southeast, intersecting Dempsey Barron Rd toward Hosford. The route intersects SR 65 in Hosford, after which the road intersects barely any more important roads in the county until it reaches, and running concurrent to, SR 267 right before crossing the Ochlockonee River into Leon County.

Leon County (including Tallahassee) 
SR 20/SR 267 intersect CR 375 shortly after crossing county lines right before SR 267 splits from SR 20 as Bloxham Cutoff, going to US 98 heading to Perry, bypassing Tallahassee. SR 20, meanwhile, goes northeast, intersecting many rural roads through Fort Braden. The route goes straight east once more through Apalachicola National Forest before intersecting some more small, local roads while encountering a few stop light intersections. Finally, SR 20 enters Tallahassee and meets SR 263/Capital Circle SW and directly after meets SR 366, which heads east as Pensacola Street leading to Stadium Drive, while SR 20 heads north as Blountstown Street. About 1.3 miles later, SR 20 meets US 90/Tennessee Street and turns right into a hidden concurrency. The two roads head southeast along Tennessee St before drifting northeast and then east. After intersecting Stadium Drive, the roads head southeast again, passing along the north side of Florida State University. Heading directly east into downtown, the routes meet US 27/SR 61/Monroe Street, where SR 20 turns right onto these routes into another hidden concurrency, while US 90 continues as Tennessee Street heading east. Routes 20/27/61 run south along Monroe Street until heading east with US 27 along Apalachee Parkway in front of the Florida Capitol building, while SR 61 continues south along Monroe Street. Routes 20/27 head east along Apalachee Parkway out of Tallahassee, intersecting US 319/Capital Circle SE along the way. The two routes remain four laned throughout the rest of Leon County.

Jefferson County and Madison County 
Remaining four laned all the way to Perry, US 27/SR 20 head east, intersecting SR 59. Around halfway between Capps and SR 59 is CR 259 in Waukeenah. In Capps, US 19, heading south from Monticello, join the 20/27 concurrency before the roads go right slightly before going even more southeast heading briefly into Madison County. In Madison County, the roads intersect CR 150 before entering Taylor County.

Taylor County 
US 19/SR 20/US 27 head into Taylor County as Byron Butler Parkway, retaining four lanes and southeasterly direction. The routes go almost go perfectly straight for 16.5 miles until they reach Perry, where the routes go briefly south, where an intersection with US 98/Hampton Springs Avenue has US 19 leaving the concurrency with US 27/SR 20 to go along US 98 southbound heading towards St Petersburg, with 20/27 going east along Hampton Springs. A few blocks later, the routes intersect US 221/Jefferson St before leaving Perry and soon afterwards Taylor County, continuing east.

Lafayette County 
As a two lane road, US 27/SR 20 head east, intersecting CR 348 and soon after CR 534. Afterwards, the roads head southeast again toward Mayo, where the roads go east, as well as intersecting SR 51, then after Mayo, head southeast once more. Curving slightly northeast, the routes intersect SR 349 and quickly enter Branford in Suwannee County.

Suwannee County/Columbia County 
Immediately after crossing the county line, the roads enter the town of Branford, intersecting US 129/SR 249. After Branford, the roads head east to intersect SR 49. Routes 20/27 soon head southeast upon entering Columbia County, intersecting SR 47 in Fort White before CR 18 terminates at the routes, which briefly go south to then resuming their southeasterly direction towards High Springs.

Alachua County 
Upon entering Alachua County, routes 20/27 enter High Springs. In the city, the two routes meet with US 41 where US 27 finally parts ways with SR 20 by turning south onto US 41, ending their 120 mile long concurrency. SR 20 is independent (and is a signed route) for a few blocks in High Springs before becoming concurrent with US 441, where it goes into yet another hidden concurrency, shared with hidden SR 25. The routes head slightly southeast as a four-lane road, intersecting I-75 at exit 399 and entering Alachua, intersecting SR 235. The roads curve to the south as they enter Gainesville, where US 441 goes south onto 13th st while SR 20 heads southeast on 6th street to then go south to parallel US 441. SR 20 then goes east on 8th Avenue and then south onto Main Street before turning east again on SR 24/26. Finally, SR 20/24/26 goes east, then SR 20 goes southeast on Hawthorne Road to Hawthorne, where it intersects US 301, to enter Putnam County.

Putnam County 
As SR 20 goes slightly northeast, it intersects SR 21. Going east, the route goes to Interlachen where it intersects CR 315, where the road increases to four lanes to Palatka. The road is kept four lanes through Palatka, where it is known as Crill Avenue, and intersecting SR 19, then heads east to Palm Avenue where it is reduced to two lanes. SR 20 continues to head east along Crill Avenue, then turns north on 9th avenue to US 17 (under one last hidden concurrency), where they cross the St Johns River on the Palatka Memorial Bridge and curve south in East Palatka toward San Mateo, where SR 20 leaves the concurrency with SR 100 from US 17 to head southeast out of Putnam County.

Flagler County 
SR 20/100 continue their southeasterly direction for a bit to head straight east to intersect CR 305 and CR 205, then they go east to go into Bunnell, where SR 20 ends at US 1 just after going over an overpass. SR 100, however, goes concurrent with US 1 to Bunnell and continues to SR A1A.

Route naming
The portion of SR 20 running through all of Calhoun County was designated as "Fuller Warren Parkway" by the Florida State Legislature in 1999.

The portion of SR 20 that runs in a hidden concurrency with US 27 in Leon County was designated as "Apalachee Parkway" by the Florida State Legislature in 1961.

The portion of SR 20 that runs in a hidden concurrency with US 27 in Leon, Jefferson, Madison, and  Taylor counties was designated as "Blue Star Memorial Highway" by the Florida State Legislature in 1957. The same portion of SR 20 in Taylor, Jefferson, and Leon counties was also designated as "Paradise Drive" by the Florida State Legislature in 1951.

The portion of hidden SR 20 from Perry to High Springs in Columbia County, as well as all of SR 20 that runs as a hidden concurrency with US 27 in Lafayette and Suwannee counties, was designated as "Fred P Parker Memorial Highway" by the Florida State Legislature in 1941.

The portion of SR 20 in Alachua County that runs in a hidden concurrency with US 441 was designated as "Martin Luther King Jr. Highway" by the Florida State Legislature in 1988.

The portion of SR 20 in Alachua County that runs in a hidden concurrency with US 27 was designated as "United Spanish War Veterans Memorial Highway" by the Florida State Legislature in 1947.

The entire portion of SR 20 that runs in a hidden concurrency with US 27 was designated as "Claude Pepper Memorial Highway" by the Florida State Legislature in 1999.  Further, the same co-signed portion of SR 20  was designated as "Purple Heart Highway" by the Florida State Highway Board in 2010.

Major intersections

Related routes

County Road 0120

County Road 0120 (CR 0120) is a short piece of an old alignment of State Road 20, at the Liberty/Leon County Line. CR 0120 only extends a couple of tenths of a mile (about 300 m) to the Ochlockonee River, where the old bridge has been dismantled; thus, it no longer connects, to Leon County CR 20, on the other side of the river.

The reasons for a realignment were to straighten out the curve on the Leon County side and to bypass a residential area. Along CR 0120, are entrances to a couple of residences and an abandoned gas station.

County Road 20A

County Road 20A is a suffixed county alternate route on the south side of SR 20 in western Putnam County. It begins at the southern terminus of State Road 21 in McMeekin, and runs southeast towards Johnson, and Edgar, finally reaching Interlachen, where it turns north to meet SR 20 again.

References

External links

Florida Route Log (SR 20)

020
020
020
020
020
020
020
020
020
020
020
020
020
020
020
020
020
020